American Strays is a 1996 American comedy-drama film directed by Michael Covert. It follows three interwoven stories of desert travelers as they converge on a small diner.

Synopsis
Red's Desert Diner Oasis, a dive in the middle of nowhere, becomes the focal point of three separate storylines. In the first, Dwayne (Savage), a homicidal vacuum cleaner salesman, may have met his match in Patty Mae (Tilly), a woman with an impressive collection of sweepers. The second story follows Johnny (Perry), a suicidal man who hires a sadistic hitman (Jones) to end his life anyway possible which includes beating the ever loving crap out of him. The third story follows an unemployed man (Roberts) and his family, two mobsters (Viterelli and Russo), and others as they travel across the emptiness of the American Southwest.

Cast
 Scott Plank as Sonny
 Melora Walters as Cindy
 John Savage as Dwayne
 Brion James as Oris
 Joe Viterelli as Gene
 James Russo as Eddie
 Luke Perry as Johnny
 Will Rothhaar as Jordan
 Jessica Lerelman as Daphne
 Toni Kalem as Alice
 Eric Roberts as Martin
 Vonte Sweet as Mondo
 Anthony Lee as Omar
 Stephanie Cushna as Johnny's Girlfriend
 Sam J. Jones as The Exterminator
 Stace Williamson as Johnny's Brother
 Carol Kane as Helen
 Luana Anders as Martha
 Jack Kehler as Walker
 Robert Fields as Harry
 Charles Bailey-Gates as Bobby
 Thomas Elliott as Timmy
 Jennifer Tilly as Patty Mae
 Michael Horse as Lead Cop
 Leland Crooke as Cop #2
 Michael Kaliski as Cop #3
 Patrick Warburton as Rookie Cop

Reception
American Strays was released to a single theater on September 13, 1996. The film grossed $1,183 in its opening weekend and $1,910 in total during its theatrical release.

Stephen Holden of The New York Times wrote in his review that the film "has the germ of a good idea" but concluded American Strays is "a spoof in search of a sense of humor".

References

External links
 
 
 

1996 films
1996 comedy-drama films
1990s English-language films
American comedy-drama films
1990s American films